John Divers (8 March 1940 – 23 September 2014) was a Scottish footballer who played for Celtic and Partick Thistle.

Playing career

Club
Born in Clydebank, Divers was the son of former Scottish international John Divers and grand-nephew of ex-Celtic player Patsy Gallacher. He played 248 games for Celtic between November 1957 and September 1965. Playing mostly as an inside left, he scored 110 goals for the club, which helped gain him a reputation as a skilful, clever and hard working player.

He contributed to Celtic's nine consecutive league championships in a row by scoring the first goal of that period, away against Dundee United in 1965. After joining Partick Thistle in the early part of the 1966–67 season, he later retired from the Senior game in 1969 to attend Strathclyde University.

International
Divers was part of a number of Scotland squads (including a 1962 match against Uruguay) but never got onto the field. He played on three occasions for the Scottish League XI, scoring 4 goals.

Later life
Divers spent some of his later life in teaching, spending most of his career in St Patrick's High (where he'd also been a pupil), later Our Lady and St Patrick's High School in Dumbarton. He died in September 2014. His family connections mean he was related to fellow footballing descendants of Patsy Gallacher: sons Willie and Tommy, and grandsons Brian and Kevin.

References

External links
 John Divers profile thecelticwiki.com

1940 births
2014 deaths
Sportspeople from Clydebank
Footballers from West Dunbartonshire
Scottish footballers
People educated at Our Lady & St Patrick's High School
Alumni of the University of Strathclyde
Scottish schoolteachers
Association football inside forwards
Scottish Junior Football Association players
Renfrew F.C. players
Scottish Football League players
Celtic F.C. players
Partick Thistle F.C. players
Scottish Football League representative players
Gallacher family (footballers)